The 2008–09 Los Angeles Lakers season was the franchise's 61st season, 60th in the National Basketball Association (NBA) and 49th in Los Angeles. The Lakers won their division for the 31st time and appeared in the Western Conference Finals for the 39th time. With 65 wins, they tied the 1986–87 team for the third most wins in franchise history, the most since 1999–2000, and improved on their 2007–08 record by eight wins. The Lakers sold out all 41 home games for the season, led the NBA in money earned from overall ticket sales, and had the 5th highest increase in gate receipts from the previous season. The Lakers had the third best team offensive rating in the NBA.

In the playoffs, the Lakers defeated the Utah Jazz in five games in the First Round, then defeated the Houston Rockets in a hard-fought seven games in the Semifinals, and on May 29, the Lakers defeated the Denver Nuggets in the Western Conference Finals to advance to the NBA Finals for the second consecutive year and 30th time in franchise history, extending their NBA record for most Finals appearances. On June 14, the Los Angeles Lakers defeated the Orlando Magic 4–1 in the best of seven series to become the 2009 NBA champions, winning their first championship in seven years, their tenth title in Los Angeles, and the 15th overall in franchise history. Kobe Bryant was awarded the 2009 NBA Finals MVP. Following the season, Trevor Ariza signed as a free agent with the Houston Rockets.

On July 15, 2009, the Los Angeles Lakers won the 2009 ESPY Awards for Best Team and Best Coach/Manager for Phil Jackson.

Key dates
 June 26: The 2008 NBA draft took place in New York City.
 July 1: The free agency period started.
 October 7: The Lakers pre-season started with a game against the Utah Jazz.
 October 28: The Lakers won their season opener against the Portland Trail Blazers at Staples Center.
 December 8: With a 17–2 season start, the Lakers tied their record for best opening in franchise history.
 December 25: The Lakers avenged their 2008 NBA Finals loss with a 92–83 win over the Boston Celtics, ending Boston's 19-game winning streak.
 February 2: Kobe Bryant scored 61 points, the most ever scored at Madison Square Garden.
 February 8: The Lakers ended the Cavaliers 23-game home winning streak. The Lakers also became the first team in NBA history to win back-to-back games on the road (Boston and Cleveland), against teams with .800-plus win percentage at least 40 games into the season. Cleveland's loss to L.A. was one of only three games they lost at home all season, including the playoffs.
 February 14–15: 2009 NBA All-Star Weekend took place.
 March 12: The Lakers clinched the Pacific Division title with a win over the San Antonio Spurs.
 March 26: The Lakers matched last season's win total (57) with 11 games remaining with a win over the Detroit Pistons.
 March 27: The Lakers clinched the top record in the Western Conference with a win against the New Jersey Nets for their 58th win.
 April 14: The Lakers ended their regular season with a 125–112 victory over the Utah Jazz, becoming the third-winningest team in franchise history with 65 wins.
 April 19: The Lakers played their first playoff game of the season against the Utah Jazz.
 April 27: The Lakers won their Western Conference First Round series 4–1 over the Utah Jazz, advancing to the Conference Semi-Finals.
 May 17: The Lakers defeated the Houston Rockets in Game 7 of the Western Conference Semi-Finals and advance to the Western Conference Finals.
 May 29: The Lakers defeated the Denver Nuggets in Game 6 of the Western Conference Finals and advance to the 2009 NBA Finals.
 June 14: The Lakers defeated the Orlando Magic in Game 5 of 2009 NBA Finals, winning their 15th championship in franchise history.

Offseason

Injuries
Following the 2007–08 NBA season, the Lakers faced two key injuries in the offseason. Andrew Bynum, who missed the second half of the season and playoffs was rehabilitating and working on conditioning. Trevor Ariza, who also missed the second half of the season, but later returned in the playoffs also had to work back into shape. Both players played on opening day. During the 2007–08 season, Kobe Bryant suffered a tear in his right pinkie finger. At the time, Bryant decided to forgo surgery and play out the rest of the season and participate in the 2008 Summer Olympics in Beijing. He eventually chose to not to have surgery and let the hand heal naturally.

Departures
The most notable departure was last year's backup power forward Ronny Turiaf to the Golden State Warriors. As a restricted free agent, the Lakers were allowed to match any offer that another team gave Turiaf. The Lakers chose not to match the 4 year $17 million offer the Warriors gave.

Ira Newble, who the Lakers picked up midway through the 2007–08 season, was not re-signed and remained a free agent for the rest of the season. Coby Karl was also cut from the roster with Sun Yue replacing him.

Signings
Sasha Vujacic was the first member of the Lakers to sign a contract with the team in the offseason. Still, contract negotiations dragged on longer than usual because he wasn't signed to a tender offer from another team as a restricted free agent. Vujacic considered playing in Europe, but ultimately signed a 3-year contract worth $15 million with the Lakers.

Andrew Bynum, who is signed for the 2008–09 season, signed a 4-year contract extension for $57.4 million.

DJ Mbenga re-signed with the team for one year for approximately $850,000. Josh Powell was also signed to a one-year contract to replace the departed Ronny Turiaf
The Lakers 2007 NBA draft pick Sun Yue, spent the entire 07–08 season playing for the Beijing Olympians in the ABA. He also played for China in the 2008 Summer Olympics. In the offseason the Lakers signed him to a 2-year deal.

Joe Crawford, C.J. Giles, Brandon Heath, and Dwayne Mitchell signed to the Lakers roster during the offseason but were all released before the season began.

Draft picks

Due to the midseason trade for Pau Gasol in February 2008, the Lakers only had a second round draft pick in 2008. With it they selected Joe Crawford from Kentucky. He signed with the Lakers on August 27, 2008, but was waived October 22, during the 2008–09 pre-season.

Trades
On February 7, Vladimir Radmanović was traded to the Charlotte Bobcats in return for Adam Morrison and Shannon Brown. The deal was made largely to save money to be able to resign players during the off-season, notably Lamar Odom and Trevor Ariza.

On February 18, backup center Chris Mihm was traded to the Memphis Grizzlies for a conditional second round draft pick in 2013. The trade saves the Lakers approximately $2 million in salary and luxury tax money.

Roster

Season summary
When the Lakers made it all the way to the 2008 NBA Finals without starter Andrew Bynum, they were seen as the favorites from the Western Conference to return there in 2009. The team's original starting lineup was:

C – Andrew Bynum
PF – Pau Gasol
SF – Vladimir Radmanović
SG – Kobe Bryant
PG – Derek Fisher

Having Radmanović start at SF instead of Lamar Odom was seen as a way to space out the offense since two 7-footers, Bynum and Gasol, were in the starting lineup.

With Bynum starting and swingman Trevor Ariza healthy, the team started off the season with a 7–0 record. A week later they tied the record for best start in franchise history. They were unable to break the record the next game, losing to the Sacramento Kings on the road. After peaking at a 21–3 record the Lakers played 4 games in 5 days on the road. They finished the road trip with a sub-par 2–2 record and were facing a rematch of last year's finals against the Boston Celtics on Christmas Day. Under the national spotlight the two teams kept the game close well into the fourth quarter, where the Lakers finally pulled away in the last 2:48 of the game. Phil Jackson earned his 1,000th career win in the game. The Lakers went to win 10 of 11 games, before losing back to back against the San Antonio Spurs and the Orlando Magic.

The losses revealed how injuries to role players Luke Walton and Jordan Farmar could affect the Lakers. Jackson eventually benched the under-performing Radmanović and was replaced by Walton in the starting lineup. Walton was chosen as starter because of his good passing skills and Jackson wanted to emphasize ball movement in the offense. Andrew Bynum was also criticized for his poor play, including a one rebound performance against the Houston Rockets on January 13. Bynum responded by going five straight games with a double-double including a career best 42 points against the Los Angeles Clippers. Around the same time Kobe Bryant also recorded two triple-doubles for the first and second time in his career since 2005.

On January 31, against the Memphis Grizzlies, Bynum left the game with an injured right knee after he was hit by Bryant driving to the basket. An MRI scan revealed he had a tear of the medial collateral ligament in his right knee and was expected to miss 8–12 weeks. To adjust to the injury Pau Gasol moved from power forward to center to replace Bynum and Lamar Odom was put into the starting lineup as power forward to replace Gasol. On February 7 the Lakers traded Vladimir Radmanović to the Charlotte Bobcats for Adam Morrison and Shannon Brown. Radmanović saw his role decrease drastically with the Lakers when he was taken out of the starting lineup, often coming in behind Walton and Trevor Ariza.

In a road game against the New York Knicks on February 2, Bryant scored 61 points on 61% shooting in a 126–117 win. Bryant's scoring outburst set a record for the most points ever scored at the historic Madison Square Garden, breaking Bernard King's record he remained for nearly five years until Carmelo Anthony broke his own record at this arena scored 62 points in 2014. Bryant's performance was also the highest single game point total of the 2008–2009 season in the NBA.

Aside from the team record, another result of the team's success was Kobe Bryant, Pau Gasol and Phil Jackson being selected to play and coach in the 2009 NBA All-Star Game. Bryant was named the All-Star MVP along with former teammate Shaquille O'Neal. After the All-Star break, the Lakers won 17 of 19 games.

After playing 27 of their first 46 games at home (a league high) the Lakers were on the road for 22 of 31 games; which started with a six-game road trip and ended with a seven-game road trip. The Lakers won the first six games on the road, including wins against the top two teams in the Eastern Conference, the Boston Celtics and the Cleveland Cavaliers (Cleveland's first of two home losses during the regular season). After the All-Star break, the Lakers won six straight games, but then went 2-5 including going 0–3 on the road. The Lakers redeemed themselves by winning two road games in two days; including a win against the Houston Rockets who were on a 12-game home winning streak and their Western rivals (and second seeded team in the West) the San Antonio Spurs.

In March, after recommending Phil Jackson to, Luke Walton was moved to the bench and was replaced with Trevor Ariza. Jackson hoped he can spark the bench activity which dwindled throughout the year. The change caused a surge in Ariza's production and allowed Walton to play less minutes against opposing teams' starting players. The Lakers were dealing with giving up leads in games and receiving inconsistent production from the reserves.

After spending the entire season with the best record in the Western Conference the Lakers clinched the top record in the Western Conference on March 27. Since then they were in a race with the Cleveland Cavaliers to finish with the best record in the league and secure home court advantage throughout the playoffs. With a loss to the Sixers on March 17, the Lakers fell to second place overall. They eventually conceded the best regular-season record to Cleveland and clinched the #2 record in the league in April. On April 9, Bynum returned to the Lakers after missing 31 games. His first game back he started and scored 16 points off of 7-11 shooting and grabbed 7 rebounds.

Post season

Utah Jazz
The Lakers went 65–17, and clinched the Pacific Division and home court advantage throughout the Western Conference playoffs. In the first round, the Lakers faced the eight-seeded Utah Jazz. The Lakers won Games 1 and 2 at the Staples, but lost Game 3 in Salt Lake City, following a game winner from Deron Williams. All three games saw the Lakers give up big leads, though they were able to still hold the series edge. After a 5-24 performance in Game 3, Kobe Bryant scored 38 points in Game 4 on 16 of 24 shooting in a road win. The Lakers won the series in Game 5 with a 107–96 win at home.

Houston Rockets
In the second round the Lakers faced the Houston Rockets. In Game 1, the Lakers fell behind in the first quarter and never got into a rhythm. As a result, they lost their first home game of the postseason. The Lakers rebounded in Game 2 behind Bryant's 40 point performance and a double double by Gasol and tied the series up at 1 win each. The game was very intense and physical as Derek Fisher of the Lakers and Ron Artest got ejected and technical fouls were assessed to Bryant, Artest, Luis Scola, Luke Walton and Lamar Odom. The series moved to Houston for Game 3 which the Lakers won 108–94 to retake home court advantage in the series. The Lakers went on to lose Game 4 87–99, despite Rockets center Yao Ming missing the game (and rest of the series) with a broken foot. In Game 5 the Lakers blew out the Rockets by 40 points, tying the Rockets worst loss in franchise history. Game 6 in Houston was a decisive 95-80 Rockets win. The Rockets jumped out to a 17–1 lead to start the game and were up at half time by 16. Game 6 was the most watched basketball game ever on ESPN. The final game of the series was played in Los Angeles on May 17. The Lakers routed the Rockets and won the game 89–70. With 2:30 left in the game the Lakers were up 89-58 and Bryant sat out for most of the 4th quarter. Kobe Bryant scored 14 points his lowest number of playoff points. In each game of the series the team that led at the first quarter won the game.

Denver Nuggets
In the third round the Lakers faced the Denver Nuggets. In Game 1, the Lakers fell behind in the first quarter by up to 13 points. In the second quarter the Lakers found their rhythm and took a 55–54 lead at halftime. In the fourth quarter the game was close and Kobe Bryant scored 18 of his 40 points in that quarter to lead the Lakers to a 105–103 to take a 1–0 series lead. In Game 2, the Lakers took a 41–27 lead in the second quarter. In the final minutes of the second quarter the Nuggets went on a 14–2 run to get themselves within 1. Ever since that the game was close. The Nuggets were able to get a win at Staples Center 106-103 which gave the Lakers their second home loss of the postseason. In Game 3, there was another close game which the winner was not decided until the Lakers pulled away at 12 seconds when Bryant made 2 free throws. The Lakers stole home court advantage back from the Nuggets with a 41-point performance from Kobe Bryant (13 of them in the 4th quarter). The Lakers were able to stop Denver's 16 home game winning streak by defeating the Nuggets 103–97 to take a 2–1 series lead. The Denver Nuggets would even the series by defeating the Lakers 120–101, thanks in part to 49 free throw attempts. The Lakers 120 points were the most the franchise has ever given up on the postseason, and they also allowed Denver to score 43 points in the 4th quarter. The Lakers defeated the Nuggets at Staples Center 103–94 in Game 5. Game 6 was a blowout in which the Lakers defeated the Nuggets 119–92 to advance to its franchise's 30th NBA Finals appearance.

Orlando Magic

While the Lakers were making their NBA record 30th Finals appearance, the Magic were entering only their second in franchise history. The Lakers had home court advantage due to having the better regular season record. The Lakers earned a blowout win in Game 1, defeating the Magic by 25 points. Game 2 was a tighter contest, with Magic guard Courtney Lee missing a game winning lay-up off an inbounds lob at the end of regulation. Instead, the game went into overtime and the Lakers prevailed. The series switched to Orlando for games 3, 4, and 5. In Game 3 the Magic shot 75% in the first half and 62.5% in the game, both NBA Finals records, to win by 4 and bring the series to 2–1. Game 4 was another close game. Derek Fisher hit two key 3-pointers, one with 4.6 seconds left in regulation to tie the game, and the other with 31.3 seconds to go in overtime. The Lakers moved within one win of their 15th championship by beating the Orlando Magic 99–91 to open a 3–1 series lead. The Lakers defeated the Magic in Game 5 to clinch their 15th NBA Championship with a 99–86 win, winning two consecutive games in Orlando.

Regular season

Standings

Game log

|- style="background:#bfb;"
| 1
| October 28
| Portland
| 
| Kobe Bryant (23)
| Kobe Bryant (11)
| Jordan Farmar (6)
| Staples Center18,997
| 1–0
|- style="background:#bfb;"
| 2
| October 29
| @ L.A. Clippers
| 
| Kobe Bryant (16)
| Pau Gasol, Andrew Bynum (9)
| Pau Gasol (6)
| Staples Center19,060
| 2–0

|- style="background:#bfb;"
| 3
| November 1
| @ Denver
| 
| Kobe Bryant (33)
| Pau Gasol (16)
| Derek Fisher (4)
| Pepsi Center19,651
| 3–0
|- style="background:#bfb;"
| 4
| November 5
| L.A. Clippers
| 
| Kobe Bryant (27)
| Andrew Bynum (17)
| Pau Gasol, Kobe Bryant, Derek Fisher (3)
| Staples Center18,997
| 4–0
|- style="background:#bfb;"
| 5
| November 9
| Houston
| 
| Kobe Bryant (23)
| Pau Gasol (15)
| Jordan Farmar (6)
| Staples Center18,997
| 5–0
|- style="background:#bfb;"
| 6
| November 11
| @ Dallas
| 
| Kobe Bryant (27)
| Pau Gasol (11)
| Derek Fisher, Andrew Bynum, Jordan Farmar (3)
| American Airlines Center20,391
| 6–0
|- style="background:#bfb;"
| 7
| November 12
| @ New Orleans
| 
| Kobe Bryant, Derek Fisher (20)
| Lamar Odom (9)
| Kobe Bryant (6)
| New Orleans Arena18,239
| 7–0
|- style="background:#fcc;"
| 8
| November 14
| Detroit
| 
| Kobe Bryant (29)
| Pau Gasol (10)
| Kobe Bryant, Pau Gasol (6)
| Staples Center18,997
| 7–1
|- style="background:#bfb;"
| 9
| November 18
| Chicago
| 
| Pau Gasol (34)
| Andrew Bynum (9)
| Kobe Bryant (6)
| Staples Center18,997
| 8–1
|- style="background:#bfb;"
| 10
| November 20
| @ Phoenix
| 
| Kobe Bryant (24)
| Lamar Odom, Pau Gasol (9)
| Pau Gasol (9)
| US Airways Center18,422
| 9–1
|- style="background:#bfb;"
| 11
| November 21
| Denver
| 
| Kobe Bryant (29)
| Andrew Bynum (13)
| Andrew Bynum (5)
| Staples Center18,997
| 10–1
|- style="background:#bfb;"
| 12
| November 23
| Sacramento
| 
| Kobe Bryant (24)
| Trevor Ariza (11)
| Kobe Bryant (6)
| Staples Center18,997
| 11–1
|- style="background:#bfb;"
| 13
| November 25
| New Jersey
| 
| Pau Gasol (26)
| Pau Gasol (8)
| Kobe Bryant, Trevor Ariza (4)
| Staples Center18,997
| 12–1
|- style="background:#bfb;"
| 14
| November 28
| Dallas
| 
| Kobe Bryant (35)
| Andrew Bynum (10)
| Kobe Bryant (5)
| Staples Center18,997
| 13–1
|- style="background:#bfb;"
| 15
| November 30
| Toronto
| 
| Pau Gasol (24)
| Andrew Bynum, Lamar Odom (10)
| Kobe Bryant (7)
| Staples Center18,997
| 14–1

|- style="background:#fcc;"
| 16
| December 2
| @ Indiana
| 
| Kobe Bryant (28)
| Pau Gasol, Andrew Bynum (9)
| Lamar Odom (5)
| Conseco Fieldhouse16,412
| 14–2
|- style="background:#bfb;"
| 17
| December 3
| @ Philadelphia
| 
| Kobe Bryant (32)
| Pau Gasol (13)
| Kobe Bryant, Derek Fisher, Trevor Ariza, Andrew Bynum (4)
| Wachovia Center19,119
| 15–2
|- style="background:#bfb;"
| 18
| December 5
| @ Washington
| 
| Kobe Bryant (23)
| Pau Gasol, Andrew Bynum (10)
| Kobe Bryant (7)
| Verizon Center20,173
| 16–2
|- style="background:#bfb;"
| 19
| December 7
| Milwaukee
| 
| Kobe Bryant (20)
| Andrew Bynum (14)
| Kobe Bryant (8)
| Staples Center18,997
| 17–2
|- style="background:#fcc;"
| 20
| December 9
| @ Sacramento
| 
| Kobe Bryant (28)
| Pau Gasol (12)
| Trevor Ariza (4)
| ARCO Arena16,068
| 17–3
|- style="background:#bfb;"
| 21
| December 10
| Phoenix
| 
| Pau Gasol (28)
| Andrew Bynum (11)
| Lamar Odom (7)
| Staples Center18,997
| 18–3
|- style="background:#bfb;"
| 22
| December 12
| Sacramento
| 
| Kobe Bryant (32)
| Pau Gasol (11)
| Luke Walton (8)
| Staples Center18,997
| 19–3
|- style="background:#bfb;"
| 23
| December 14
| Minnesota
| 
| Kobe Bryant (26)
| Pau Gasol (11)
| Pau Gasol, Derek Fisher (6)
| Staples Center18,997
| 20–3
|- style="background:#bfb;"
| 24
| December 16
| New York
| 
| Kobe Bryant (28)
| Lamar Odom (12)
| Derek Fisher (7)
| Staples Center18,997
| 21–3
|- style="background:#fcc;"
| 25
| December 19
| @ Miami
| 
| Kobe Bryant (28)
| Pau Gasol (11)
| Derek Fisher (4)
| American Airlines Arena19,600
| 21–4
|- style="background:#fcc;"
| 26
| December 20
| @ Orlando
| 
| Kobe Bryant (41)
| Kobe Bryant, Lamar Odom (8)
| Derek Fisher (4)
| Amway Arena17,461
| 21–5
|- style="background:#bfb;"
| 27
| December 22
| @ Memphis
| 
| Kobe Bryant (36)
| Pau Gasol (7)
| Pau Gasol (6)
| FedExForum17,456
| 22–5
|- style="background:#bfb;"
| 28
| December 23
| @ New Orleans
| 
| Kobe Bryant (26)
| Lamar Odom (8)
| Lamar Odom (5)
| New Orleans Arena18,405
| 23–5
|- style="background:#bfb;"
| 29
| December 25
| Boston
| 
| Kobe Bryant (27)
| Kobe Bryant (9)
| Derek Fisher (7)
| Staples Center18,997
| 24–5
|- style="background:#bfb;"
| 30
| December 28
| Golden State
| 
| Kobe Bryant (31)
| Andrew Bynum (10)
| Pau Gasol (7)
| Staples Center18,997
| 25–5

|- style="background:#bfb;"
| 31
| January 2
| Utah
| 
| Kobe Bryant (40)
| Pau Gasol (11)
| Pau Gasol (6)
| Staples Center18,997
| 26–5
|- style="background:#bfb;"
| 32
| January 4
| Portland
| 
| Kobe Bryant (26)
| Andrew Bynum (10)
| Derek Fisher (5)
| Staples Center18,997
| 27–5
|- style="background:#fcc;"
| 33
| January 6
| New Orleans
| 
| Kobe Bryant (39)
| Pau Gasol, Andrew Bynum (8)
| Kobe Bryant (7)
| Staples Center18,997
| 27–6
|- style="background:#bfb;"
| 34
| January 7
| @ Golden State
| 
| Pau Gasol (33)
| Pau Gasol (18)
| Derek Fisher (8)
| Oracle Arena19,596
| 28–6
|- style="background:#bfb;"
| 35
| January 9
| Indiana
| 
| Kobe Bryant (36)
| Pau Gasol (11)
| Kobe Bryant (13)
| Staples Center18,997
| 29–6
|- style="background:#bfb;"
| 36
| January 11
| Miami
| 
| Andrew Bynum (24)
| Pau Gasol (18)
| Derek Fisher (11)
| Staples Center18,997
| 30–6
|- style="background:#bfb;"
| 37
| January 13
| @ Houston
| 
| Kobe Bryant (33)
| Kobe Bryant, Pau Gasol (7)
| Kobe Bryant, Pau Gasol, Lamar Odom (4)
| Toyota Center18,557
| 31–6
|- style="background:#fcc;"
| 38
| January 14
| @ San Antonio
| 
| Kobe Bryant (29)
| Kobe Bryant (7)
| Kobe Bryant (10)
| AT&T Center18,797
| 31–7
|- style="background:#fcc;"
| 39
| January 16
| Orlando
| 
| Kobe Bryant (28)
| Kobe Bryant (13)
| Kobe Bryant (11)
| Staples Center18,997
| 31–8
|- style="background:#bfb;"
| 40
| January 19
| Cleveland
| 
| Pau Gasol (22)
| Pau Gasol (13)
| Kobe Bryant (12)
| Staples Center18,997
| 32–8
|- style="background:#bfb;"
| 41
| January 21
| @ L.A. Clippers
| 
| Andrew Bynum (42)
| Andrew Bynum (15)
| Kobe Bryant (12)
| Staples Center19,627
| 33–8
|- style="background:#bfb;"
| 42
| January 22
| Washington
| 
| Andrew Bynum (23)
| Andrew Bynum (14)
| Derek Fisher (8)
| Staples Center18,997
| 34–8
|- style="background:#bfb;"
| 43
| January 25
| San Antonio
| 
| Kobe Bryant (22)
| Andrew Bynum (11)
| Pau Gasol, Derek Fisher (4)
| Staples Center18,997
| 35–8
|- style="background:#fcc;"
| 44
| January 27
| Charlotte
| 
| Kobe Bryant (38)
| Andrew Bynum (14)
| Derek Fisher (6)
| Staples Center18,997
| 35–9
|- style="background:#bfb;"
| 45
| January 30
| @ Minnesota
| 
| Kobe Bryant (30)
| Andrew Bynum (15)
| Kobe Bryant (5)
| Target Center19,111
| 36–9
|- style="background:#bfb;"
| 46
| January 31
| @ Memphis
| 
| Kobe Bryant (25)
| Pau Gasol (8)
| Kobe Bryant (7)
| FedExForum18,119
| 37–9

|- style="background:#bfb;"
| 47
| February 2
| @ New York
| 
| Kobe Bryant (61)
| Lamar Odom, Pau Gasol (14)
| Pau Gasol, Luke Walton (5)
| Madison Square Garden19,763
| 38–9
|- style="background:#bfb;"
| 48
| February 4
| @ Toronto
| 
| Kobe Bryant (36)
| Pau Gasol (15)
| Kobe Bryant, Luke Walton (5)
| Air Canada Centre19,800
| 39–9
|- style="background:#bfb;"
| 49
| February 5
| @ Boston
| 
| Kobe Bryant (26)
| Pau Gasol (14)
| Kobe Bryant, Derek Fisher (5)
| TD Banknorth Garden18,624
| 40–9
|- style="background:#bfb;"
| 50
| February 8
| @ Cleveland
| 
| Lamar Odom (28)
| Lamar Odom (17)
| Pau Gasol (6)
| Quicken Loans Arena20,562
| 41–9
|- style="background:#bfb;"
| 51
| February 10
| Oklahoma City
| 
| Kobe Bryant (34)
| Lamar Odom (18)
| Jordan Farmar (5)
| Staples Center18,997
| 42–9
|- style="background:#fcc;"
| 52
| February 11
| @ Utah
| 
| Kobe Bryant (37)
| Lamar Odom (19)
| Kobe Bryant, Jordan Farmar (4)
| EnergySolutions Arena19,911
| 42–10
|- style="background:#bfb;"
| 53
| February 17
| Atlanta
| 
| Lamar Odom (15)
| Lamar Odom (20)
| Pau Gasol (10)
| Staples Center18,997
| 43–10
|- style="background:#bfb;"
| 54
| February 18
| @ Golden State
| 
| Kobe Bryant (30)
| Pau Gasol (13)
| Kobe Bryant (9)
| Oracle Arena20,007
| 44–10
|- style="background:#bfb;"
| 55
| February 20
| New Orleans
| 
| Kobe Bryant (39)
| Lamar Odom (17)
| Pau Gasol (6)
| Staples Center18,997
| 45–10
|- style="background:#bfb;"
| 56
| February 22
| @ Minnesota
| 
| Kobe Bryant (28)
| Lamar Odom (14)
| Kobe Bryant (7)
| Target Center19,177
| 46–10
|- style="background:#bfb;"
| 57
| February 24
| @ Oklahoma City
| 
| Kobe Bryant (36)
| Lamar Odom, Pau Gasol (8)
| Pau Gasol (6)
| Ford Center19,136
| 47–10
|- style="background:#bfb;"
| 58
| February 26
| Phoenix
| 
| Lamar Odom (23)
| Lamar Odom, Pau Gasol (9)
| Kobe Bryant (8)
| Staples Center18,997
| 48–10
|- style="background:#fcc;"
| 59
| February 27
| @ Denver
| 
| Kobe Bryant (29)
| Lamar Odom (19)
| Derek Fisher (5)
| Pepsi Center19,920
| 48–11

|- style="background:#fcc;"
| 60
| March 1
| @ Phoenix
| 
| Kobe Bryant (49)
| Kobe Bryant (11)
| Lamar Odom (5)
| US Airways Center18,422
| 48–12
|- style="background:#bfb;"
| 61
| March 3
| Memphis
| 
| Kobe Bryant (31)
| Lamar Odom (13)
| Lamar Odom (8)
| Staples Center18,997
| 49–12
|- style="background:#bfb;"
| 62
| March 6
| Minnesota
| 
| Kobe Bryant (23)
| Pau Gasol (9)
| Kobe Bryant, Luke Walton (4)
| Staples Center18,997
| 50–12
|- style="background:#fcc;"
| 63
| March 9
| @ Portland
| 
| Kobe Bryant (26)
| Pau Gasol (13)
| Jordan Farmar, D. J. Mbenga (4)
| Rose Garden20,573
| 50–13
|- style="background:#bfb;"
| 64
| March 11
| @ Houston
| 
| Kobe Bryant (37)
| Josh Powell (9)
| Kobe Bryant (6)
| Toyota Center18,449
| 51–13
|- style="background:#bfb;"
| 65
| March 12
| @ San Antonio
| 
| Kobe Bryant, Pau Gasol (23)
| Pau Gasol (11)
| Kobe Bryant (6)
| AT&T Center18,797
| 52–13
|- style="background:#bfb;"
| 66
| March 15
| Dallas
| 
| Kobe Bryant (28)
| Lamar Odom (14)
| Derek Fisher (6)
| Staples Center18,997
| 53–13
|- style="background:#fcc;"
| 67
| March 17
| Philadelphia
| 
| Pau Gasol (25)
| Lamar Odom (11)
| Pau Gasol (6)
| Staples Center18,997
| 53–14
|- style="background:#bfb;"
| 68
| March 19
| Golden State
| 
| Kobe Bryant, Pau Gasol (21)
| Pau Gasol (14)
| Jordan Farmar (7)
| Staples Center18,997
| 54–14
|- style="background:#bfb;"
| 69
| March 21
| @ Chicago
| 
| Kobe Bryant (28)
| Pau Gasol (10)
| Kobe Bryant (7)
| United Center23,011
| 55–14
|- style="background:#bfb;"
| 70
| March 24
| @ Oklahoma City
| 
| Kobe Bryant (19)
| Pau Gasol (14)
| Pau Gasol (7)
| Ford Center19,136
| 56–14
|- style="background:#bfb;"
| 71
| March 26
| @ Detroit
| 
| Kobe Bryant (30)
| Pau Gasol (11)
| Kobe Bryant, Lamar Odom (7)
| The Palace of Auburn Hills22,076
| 57–14
|- style="background:#bfb;"
| 72
| March 27
| @ New Jersey
| 
| Pau Gasol (36)
| Pau Gasol, Lamar Odom (11)
| Kobe Bryant (9)
| Izod Center19,990
| 58–14
|- style="background:#fcc;"
| 73
| March 29
| @ Atlanta
| 
| Pau Gasol (21)
| Pau Gasol (11)
| Lamar Odom, Kobe Bryant (4)
| Philips Arena20,148
| 58–15
|- style="background:#fcc;"
| 74
| March 31
| @ Charlotte
| 
| Kobe Bryant (25)
| Pau Gasol (11)
| Pau Gasol (7)
| Time Warner Cable Arena19,568
| 58–16

|- style="background:#bfb;"
| 75
| April 1
| @ Milwaukee
| 
| Kobe Bryant (30)
| Lamar Odom (10)
| Kobe Bryant (4)
| Bradley Center18,717
| 59–16
|- style="background:#bfb;"
| 76
| April 3
| Houston
| 
| Pau Gasol (23)
| Lamar Odom (11)
| Kobe Bryant (7)
| Staples Center18,997
| 60–16
|- style="background:#bfb;"
| 77
| April 5
| L.A. Clippers
| 
| Kobe Bryant, Lamar Odom (18)
| Lamar Odom (10)
| Kobe Bryant, Jordan Farmar (5)
| Staples Center18,997
| 61–16
|- style="background:#bfb;"
| 78
| April 7
| @ Sacramento
| 
| Pau Gasol (26)
| Pau Gasol (12)
| Luke Walton (9)
| ARCO Arena17,317
| 62–16
|- style="background:#bfb;"
| 79
| April 9
| Denver
| 
| Kobe Bryant (33)
| Pau Gasol (19)
| Lamar Odom (4)
| Staples Center18,997
| 63–16
|- style="background:#fcc;"
| 80
| April 10
| @ Portland
| 
| Kobe Bryant (32)
| Lamar Odom (10)
| Luke Walton (8)
| Rose Garden20,681
| 63–17
|- style="background:#bfb;"
| 81
| April 12
| Memphis
| 
| Andrew Bynum (18)
| Pau Gasol (13)
| Kobe Bryant, Lamar Odom, Luke Walton (4)
| Staples Center18,997
| 64–17
|- style="background:#bfb;"
| 82
| April 14
| Utah
| 
| Andrew Bynum (22)
| Pau Gasol (9)
| Pau Gasol (6)
| Staples Center18,997
| 65–17

Playoffs

|- style="background:#bfb;"
|1
|April 19
|Utah
|
|Kobe Bryant (24)
|Pau Gasol (9)
|Kobe Bryant (8)
|Staples Center18,997
|1–0
|- style="background:#bfb;"
|2
|April 21
|Utah
|
|Kobe Bryant (26)
|Ariza, Bryant (9)
|Bryant, Gasol (9)
|Staples Center18,997
|2–0
|- style="background:#fcc;"
|3
|April 23
|@ Utah
|
|Lamar Odom (21)
|Lamar Odom (14)
|Kobe Bryant (6)
|EnergySolutions Arena19,111
|2–1
|- style="background:#bfb;"
|4
|April 25
|@ Utah
|
|Kobe Bryant (38)
|Lamar Odom (15)
|Lamar Odom (6)
|EnergySolutions Arena19,111
|3–1
|- style="background:#bfb;"
|5
|April 27
|Utah
|
|Kobe Bryant (31)
|Lamar Odom (15)
|Ariza, Bryant, Gasol, Odom (4)
|Staples Center18,997
|4–1

|- style="background:#fcc;"
|1
|May 4
|Houston
|
|Kobe Bryant (32)
|Pau Gasol (13)
|Bryant, Gasol (4)
|Staples Center18,997
|0–1
|- style="background:#bfb;"
|2
|May 6
|Houston
|
|Kobe Bryant (40)
|Pau Gasol (14)
|Luke Walton (5)
|Staples Center18,997
|1–1
|- style="background:#bfb;"
|3
|May 8
|@ Houston
|
|Kobe Bryant (33)
|Lamar Odom (13)
|Luke Walton (7)
|Toyota Center18,495
|2–1
|- style="background:#fcc;"
|4
|May 10
|@ Houston
|
|Pau Gasol (30)
|Pau Gasol (9)
|Kobe Bryant (5)
|Toyota Center18,495
|2–2
|- style="background:#bfb;"
|5
|May 12
|Houston
|
|Kobe Bryant (26)
|Pau Gasol (13)
|Jordan Farmar (6)
|Staples Center18,997
|3–2
|- style="background:#fcc;"
|6
|May 14
|@ Houston
|
|Kobe Bryant (32)
|Lamar Odom (14)
|Kobe Bryant (3)
|Toyota Center18,501
|3–3
|- style="background:#bfb;"
|7
|May 17
|Houston
|
|Pau Gasol (21)
|Pau Gasol (18)
|Kobe Bryant (5)
|Staples Center18,997
|4–3

|- style="background:#bfb;"
|1
|May 19
|Denver
|
|Kobe Bryant (40)
|Pau Gasol (14)
|Derek Fisher (6)
|Staples Center18,997
|1–0
|- style="background:#fcc;"
|2
|May 21
|Denver
|
|Kobe Bryant  (32)
|Pau Gasol (17)
|Luke Walton  (4)
|Staples Center18,997
|1–1
|- style="background:#bfb;"
|3
|May 23
|@ Denver
|
|Kobe Bryant (41)
|Pau Gasol (11)
|Kobe Bryant (5)
|Pepsi Center19,939
|2–1
|- style="background:#fcc;"
|4
|May 25
|@ Denver
|
|Kobe Bryant (34)
|Pau Gasol (10)
|Bryant, Walton (5)
|Pepsi Center20,037
|2–2
|- style="background:#bfb;"
|5
|May 27
|Denver
|
|Kobe Bryant (22)
|Lamar Odom (14)
|Kobe Bryant (8)
|Staples Center18,997
|3–2
|- style="background:#bfb;"
|6
|May 29
|@ Denver
|
|Kobe Bryant (35)
|Pau Gasol (12)
|Kobe Bryant (10)
|Pepsi Center20,053
|4–2

|- style="background:#bfb;"
|1
|June 4
|Orlando
|
|Kobe Bryant (40)
|Lamar Odom (14)
|Kobe Bryant (8)
|Staples Center18,997
|1–0
|- style="background:#bfb;"
|2
|June 7
|Orlando
|
|Kobe Bryant (29)
|Pau Gasol (10)
|Kobe Bryant (8)
|Staples Center18,997
|2–0
|- style="background:#fcc;"
|3
|June 9
|@ Orlando
|
|Kobe Bryant (31)
|Trevor Ariza (7)
|Kobe Bryant (8)
|Amway Arena17,461
|2–1
|- style="background:#bfb;"
|4
|June 11
|@ Orlando
|
|Kobe Bryant (32)
|Pau Gasol (10)
|Kobe Bryant (8)
|Amway Arena17,461
|3–1
|- style="background:#bfb;"
|5
|June 14
|@ Orlando
|
|Kobe Bryant (30)
|Pau Gasol (15)
|Kobe Bryant (5)
|Amway Arena17,461
|4–1

Player statistics

Regular season

Playoffs

Awards and records

Awards
 The Los Angeles Lakers won the 2009 NBA Championship.
 Kobe Bryant was named the 2009 NBA Finals MVP.

All-Star
 Phil Jackson was named the Western Conference coach for the 2009 NBA All-Star Game. It was his fourth time coaching an All-Star team and second time with the Los Angeles Lakers.
 Kobe Bryant was voted to his 11th consecutive NBA All-Star Game as a starter.
 Pau Gasol was selected to his second NBA All-Star Game.
 Kobe Bryant was named the 2009 NBA All-Star MVP with former teammate Shaquille O'Neal.

Weekly/Monthly
 Phil Jackson was named Western Conference Coach of the Month for games played in October and November.
 Kobe Bryant was named Western Conference Player of the Week for games played from December 22 to December 28.
 Kobe Bryant was named Western Conference Player of the Month for December 2008.
 Kobe Bryant was named Western Conference Player of the Week for games played from January 5 to January 11.
 Andrew Bynum was named Western Conference Player of the Week for games played from January 19 to January 25.
 Kobe Bryant was named the Western Conference Player of the Month for January 2009.
 Pau Gasol was named Western Conference Player of the Week for games played from February 2 to February 8.
 Pau Gasol was named Western Conference Player of the Week for games played from February 16 to February 27.
 Pau Gasol was named Western Conference Player of the Month for February.
 Kobe Bryant was named Western Conference Player of the Week for games played from March 9 to March 15.

Records
 Phil Jackson reached 1,000 career wins on December 25, 2008, against the Boston Celtics. With 1,423 games coached, he became the fastest coach in NBA history to reach 1,000 wins, surpassing former Lakers coach Pat Riley.
 With a 17–2 season start, the Lakers tied their record for best opening in franchise history.
 On February 2, Kobe Bryant scored 61 points against the New York Knicks, making it the most points scored at Madison Square Garden ever.
 On February 8, the Lakers became the first team in NBA history to win back-to-back games on the road (Boston and Cleveland), against teams with .800-plus win percentage at least 40 games into the season.
 Vladimir Radmanović set a record for highest three-point field goal percentage in franchise history.
 On February 10, at 30 years, 171 days of age, Kobe Bryant surpassed Wilt Chamberlain (30 years, 176 days) as the youngest player to score 23,000 points in his career.
 On February 22, Kobe Bryant moved past Elgin Baylor into 20th place on the NBA's career scoring list.
 On February 24, Kobe Bryant moved past Adrian Dantley into 19th place on the NBA's career scoring list.
 On March 6, Kobe Bryant moved past Robert Parish into 18th place on the NBA's career scoring list.
 On March 27 Phil Jackson coached 728 games for the Los Angeles Lakers, surpassing the franchise record set by Pat Riley.
 On April 10, Kobe Bryant moved past Charles Barkley into 17th place on the NBA's career scoring list.
 On June 7, Phil Jackson coached his 42nd Finals game, surpassing Red Auerbach for most NBA Finals games coached.
 On June 14, Phil Jackson won his 10th NBA title as a head coach, surpassing Red Auerbach for most all-time.

Transactions

Trades

Free agents

Additions

Subtractions

References

Los Angeles Lakers seasons
Los Angeles Lakers
Western Conference (NBA) championship seasons
NBA championship seasons
Articles containing video clips
Los Angle
Los Angle